Hagfa Pinyim, (literally "Hakka Pinyin") is a system of romanization used to transcribe Chinese characters as used in Hakka into Latin script. Hagfa Pinyim was developed by Lau Chun-fat for use in his Hakka Pinyin Dictionary (literally "Hakka Pinyin Vocabulary") that was published in 1997. The romanization system is named after the Pinyin system used for Mandarin Chinese and is designed to resemble Pinyin.

Writing system
Hagfa Pinyim uses the Latin alphabet and numbers to indicate tones. A single hyphen is added to indicate a compound. Vowels indicated are regular forms but sometimes irregular forms occur.

Consonants

Semivowel

Vowels

Tones

 All words are written in their original tones instead of tones with tone sandhi.

See also
Guangdong Romanization (PinFa) for Hakka
Pha̍k-fa-sṳ

References

Hakka Chinese
Languages of Taiwan
Romanization of Chinese
Latin-script orthographies